Hans Wimmer (born 20 November 1947) is a German luger. He competed in the men's singles and doubles events at the 1972 Winter Olympics.

References

1947 births
Living people
German male lugers
Olympic lugers of West Germany
Lugers at the 1972 Winter Olympics
People from Berchtesgaden
Sportspeople from Upper Bavaria